Guilford Dudley Jr. (June 23, 1907 – June 13, 2002) was an American businessman and diplomat. He served as the United States Ambassador to Denmark under the Nixon Administration.

Early life
Guilford was born on June 23, 1907 in Nashville, Tennessee. His father, Guilford Dudley, Sr., was a co-founder of the Life and Casualty Insurance Company of Tennessee. His mother, Anne Dallas Dudley, was an activist in the women's suffrage movement in the United States.

Guilford graduated from Vanderbilt University. During World War II, he served in the United States Navy.

Career
Dudley began his career for the Life and Casualty Insurance Company in 1932. He served as its president from 1951 to 1968. Under his leadership, the company built the Life & Casualty Tower in Downtown Nashville in 1957. He merged the company with American General in 1968. It is now a subsidiary of the American International Group.

Guilford was the chairman of the finance committee of the Tennessee Republican Party. He was the finance manager on the presidential campaigns of Republican candidates Dwight Eisenhower, Richard Nixon and Gerald Ford, and he "served as an advisor to Ronald Reagan's 1980 transition team." He served as the United States Ambassador to Denmark from 1969 to 1971. He was awarded the Grand Cross of the Order of the Dannebrog.

Personal life, death and legacy
Guilford was married three times; his third wife was Jane Anderson. They resided in Palm Beach, Florida, in a house he later sold to A. Alfred Taubman. Dudley had two sons and a daughter. He was a member of the Belle Meade Country Club in Belle Meade, Tennessee, and the Everglades Club and the Bath and Tennis Club in Palm Beach. He was active in his local community, advocating for causes such as the annual Iroquois Steeplechase.

Guilford died in Nashville, Tennessee, at 94. His funeral was held at the Christ Church Cathedral, and he was buried in Mount Olivet Cemetery. His grandson Chris Dudley was a professional basketball player and politician.

References

1907 births
2002 deaths
People from Nashville, Tennessee
Vanderbilt University alumni
Ambassadors of the United States to Denmark
Businesspeople from Tennessee
Tennessee Republicans
Grand Crosses of the Order of the Dannebrog
Military personnel from Tennessee
Burials at Mount Olivet Cemetery (Nashville)
20th-century American businesspeople
Loomis Chaffee School alumni